Diplomatic relations between Denmark and Slovenia were established on 20 January 1992. Denmark has not an embassy in Ljubliana. Slovenia has an embassy in Copenhagen. Both countries are members of the European Union and NATO. There have been few ties between Denmark and Slovenia before the independence of Slovenia. In 2001, Queen Margrethe II visited Slovenia. In 2002, Danish prime minister Anders Fogh Rasmussen visited Slovenia, to support Slovenia in the European Union.

See also
 Foreign relations of Denmark 
 Foreign relations of Slovenia
 Denmark in the European Union

References

 
Slovenia
Bilateral relations of Slovenia